Lynden Hosking (born 29 June 1973) is an Australian former boxer. He competed in the men's welterweight event at the 1996 Summer Olympics.

References

External links
 

1973 births
Living people
Australian male boxers
Olympic boxers of Australia
Boxers at the 1996 Summer Olympics
Commonwealth Games medallists in boxing
Commonwealth Games bronze medallists for Australia
Boxers at the 1998 Commonwealth Games
Welterweight boxers
Medallists at the 1998 Commonwealth Games